Joseph Napier may refer to:

 Sir Joseph Napier, 1st Baronet (1804–1882), Irish member of parliament in the United Kingdom Parliament and subsequently Lord Chancellor of Ireland
 Sir Joseph Napier, 2nd Baronet (1841–1884), Irish officer in the British Army
 Sir Joseph Napier, 4th Baronet (1895–1986), British baronet and soldier
 Joseph Napier (USCG), namesake of the USCGC Joseph Napier